Pankova may refer to:

 Pankova, Ukraine, a village in Ukraine
 Pankow (surname)